The 2010 Vuelta a Murcia was the 26th edition of the Vuelta a Murcia cycle race and was held on 3 March to 7 March 2010. The race started in San Pedro del Pinatar and finished in Murcia. The race was won by František Raboň.

General classification

References

2010
2010 in road cycling
2010 in Spanish sport